Hard Core Poetry is the second studio album by American soul/R&B group Tavares, released in 1974 on the Capitol label.

Commercial performance
The album peaked at No. 12 on the R&B albums chart. It also reached No. 68 on the Billboard 200. The album features the singles "Too Late", which peaked at No. 10 on the Hot Soul Singles chart and No. 59 on the Billboard Hot 100, Hall & Oates' "She's Gone", which charted at No. 1 on the Hot Soul Singles chart and No. 50 on the Billboard Hot 100, and "Remember What I Told You to Forget", which reached No. 4 on the Hot Soul Singles chart and No. 25 on the Billboard Hot 100.

Track listing

Personnel 
Tavares
Butch Tavares
Chubby Tavares
Pooch Tavares
Ralph Tavares
Tiny Tavares
with:
Jeana Jackson - introductory narration on "To Love You"
Michael Omartian - keyboards, arrangements, conductor
Dennis Lambert – keyboards
Wilton Felder, Scott Edwards – bass
Ed Greene – drums
Larry Carlton, Dean Parks, Ben Benay – guitar
Gary Coleman, Brian Potter – percussion
Sid Sharp – string concertmaster
The Boogie Symphony – strings
Technical
Joe Sidore - recording engineer
Larkin Arnold - executive producer
Roy Kohara - art direction
Richard Rankin - cover photography

Charts
Album

Singles

References

External links

1974 albums
Tavares (group) albums
albums arranged by Michael Omartian
Capitol Records albums